Heinrich (Andreas Karl) Seilkopf (December 25, 1895 in Frankfurt (Oder) – June 27, 1968 in Hamburg) was a German meteorologist.

From March 1916 to March 1919 he was a research assistant at the weather office in Berlin and until the end of the year scientific assistant at the Meteorological Observatory in Essen.

From 1920 to March 1946 he was a meteorologist at the German Naval Observatory. In 1927 was a lecturer and fellow at the meteorological observatory Hannover. After a short time as head of the meteorological observatory Hannover, he established the department of ocean air-German Naval Observatory. From March 1930 he was at the Meteorological Observatory Hamburg. In June 1931 he was a.o. Professor at the Technical University of Hannover, since 1940 also lecturer at the University of Hamburg for Seeflugmeteorologie. In 1939 he had rediscovered the jet stream that Wasaburo Oishi had originally discovered in 1920's but was largely ignored because this paper was published in esperanto. In 1941 he was Director at the German Weather Service Seewetteramt in Hamburg-Nienstetten.

Seilkopf Peaks is named after him.

He was also interested in ornithology.

References

Meteorologische Rundschau, 21 (1968); S. 161
Walter Vogel: Westdeutschland 1945 - 1950. 3. Einzelne Verwaltungszweige; S. 280
Mitteilungen DWD 14 1965 S.8-10; 48 1968 S.48-50

1895 births
1968 deaths
People from Frankfurt (Oder)
German meteorologists